The Order of Louise (German: Luisen-Orden) was founded on 3 August 1814 by Frederick William III of Prussia to honor his late wife, the much beloved Queen Louise (née Luise Auguste Wilhelmine Amalie, Herzogin zu Mecklenburg-Strelitz). This order was chivalric in nature, but was intended strictly for women whose service to Prussia was worthy of such high national recognition. Its dame companion members were limited to 100 in number, and were intended to be drawn from all classes.

Though the Prussian king was technically the "Sovereign of the Orders" of the realm, the Chief of the Order of Louise was the reigning queen. Daughters in the royal family were invested with this order in lieu of the Order of the Black Eagle, Order of the Red Eagle Grand Cross, Prussian Crown Order First Class, and Royal House Order of Hohenzollern that were reserved for the sons.

The Order of Louise was renewed with each successive monarch. It was issued from its founding in 1814 (during the reign of Friedrich Wilhelm III) and renewed in 1850 (during the reign of Friedrich Wilhelm IV), in 1865 (during the reign of Wilhelm I), and in 1890 (during the reign of Wilhelm II).

Original statutes

The text of the original royal proclamation that created the Order roughly translates as follows:

When the men of our brave armies bled for the homeland, you found relief in the maintaining care of the women.  Faith and hope gave the mothers and daughters of the country the power… for the grand purpose (of the nation).  It is impossible to honor or (decorate them enough) for what they have accomplished; but We find it justified to lend them an honor, whose (contributions) are especially acknowledged.  We decree therefore hereby following:  
1.  The honor shall bear the meaningful name:  

L u i s e n - O r d e n

Establish that we with this, a small, black-enameled golden cross.  The (center medallion) on both sides will be of sky blue enamel; with the letter “L” (on the obverse), surrounded by a wreath of (seven) stars; and on the (reverse) the year “1813/1814”.  

2.  This order is worn (suspended from) a bow of the white ribbon of the Iron Cross (and shall be worn) on the left breast.  

3.  The award (will be bestowed) without consideration of social position or rank; however only such persons can receive it, are, who belong to the homeland through birth or marriage, or otherwise nationalized (citizens).  

4.  The number (of members) is restricted to one hundred.  

5.  To its selection let's decree hereby a Capitel, which, under the chair of the woman princess Wilhelm Königl.  Highness, out of four women …

6.  The Capitel will consider candidates, of the feminine sex, from all provinces of the nation, carefully test their credentials, out of which they will decide the worthiest, select up to the available / vacant number (of memberships) and indicate them to Us (the king and emperor) confirmation being specifically reserved for Us.  The bestowal / conferral of the award results then, after Our confirmation, under the signature of the Princess Wilhelm Königl.  Highness.  

7.  We hereby order the management of the membership to the (wife of) field marshal count v. d. Gröben.  

8.  Regarding the loss of the order: We will decide, after considering the expert opinions of the Capitels Allerhöchstselbst, if removal / expulsion should occur, … given general directions, the loss of the order and medal will follow.

Classes of membership and insignia

At its initial creation in 1814, the Order was only available in one class. A second class was added during the reign of Wilhelm I.

Dames, First Class, wore the black-enameled cross with its blue-enameled, medallion centerpiece, suspended from a predominantly white ribbon, with three black stripes, as tied in a bow.  Though the statutes indicate that the badge was to be worn on the left breast, many period portraits show the members wearing the badge on or at the left shoulder of their dresses.

Dames, Second Class, wore a similarly-designed silver cross, minus the black enamel, which was also worn suspended from the white and black bow.  The Prussian State Handbook of 1907 indicates further variants and subsets of the Second Class of the order: II.1 with silver crown, II.1 (without crown), and II.2.

Recipients

 Grand Duchess Alexandra Nikolaevna of Russia
 Alexandra of Denmark
 Princess Alexandra of Hanover (born 1882)
 Princess Alexandrine of Baden
 Alexandrine of Mecklenburg-Schwerin
 Princess Alexandrine of Prussia (1842–1906)
 Princess Alexandrine of Prussia (1803–1892)
 Princess Alexandrine of Prussia (1915–1980)
 Princess Alice of the United Kingdom
 Amalie Auguste of Bavaria
 Amélie of Leuchtenberg
 Grand Duchess Anastasia Mikhailovna of Russia
 Princess Anna of Prussia
 Infanta Antónia of Portugal
 Princess Irene, Duchess of Aosta
 Princess Louise, Duchess of Argyll
 Augusta of Saxe-Weimar-Eisenach
 Augusta Victoria of Schleswig-Holstein
 Princess Caroline Reuss of Greiz
 Duchess Cecilie of Mecklenburg-Schwerin
 Alexandra Feodorovna (Alix of Hesse)
 Alexandra Feodorovna (Charlotte of Prussia)
 Princess Charlotte of Prussia
 Elisabeth Ludovika of Bavaria
 Elisabeth of Wied
 Princess Elisabeth of Prussia
 Emma of Waldeck and Pyrmont
 Princess Feodora of Saxe-Meiningen
 Frederica of Hanover
 Frederica of Mecklenburg-Strelitz
 Princess Frederica of Prussia (1796–1850)
 Princess Helena of the United Kingdom
 Hermine Reuss of Greiz
 Countess Hedwig von Rittberg
 Countess Ina Marie von Bassewitz
 Princess Irene of Hesse and by Rhine
 Princess Joséphine Caroline of Belgium
 Princess Josephine of Baden
 Juliana of the Netherlands
 Princess Katherine of Greece and Denmark
 Grand Duchess Kira Kirillovna of Russia
 Princess Kira of Prussia
 Princess Louise Margaret of Prussia
 Princess Louise of Prussia
 Louise of Sweden
 Louise of the Netherlands
 Princess Louise Sophie of Schleswig-Holstein-Sonderburg-Augustenburg
 Princess Ludovika of Bavaria
 Princess Luise of Anhalt-Bernburg
 Princess Magdalena Reuss of Köstritz
 Princess Margaret of Prussia
 Princess Maria Anna of Anhalt-Dessau
 Maria Anna of Bavaria (born 1805)
 Grand Duchess Maria Nikolaevna of Russia (1819–1876)
 Princess Maria Teresa of Bourbon-Two Sicilies (1867–1909)
 Princess Marianne of the Netherlands
 Duchess Marie Louise of Mecklenburg-Schwerin
 Duchess Marie of Mecklenburg-Schwerin
 Marie of Prussia
 Princess Marie Alexandrine of Saxe-Weimar-Eisenach
 Princess Marie of Saxe-Weimar-Eisenach (1808–1877)
 Mary of Teck
 Princess Pauline of Waldeck and Pyrmont
 Princess Elisabeth of Saxe-Altenburg (1826–1896)
 Princess Friederike of Schleswig-Holstein-Sonderburg-Glücksburg
 Empress Shoken
 Princess Sophie of Bavaria
 Princess Sophie of Sweden
 Princess Sophie of the Netherlands
 Princess Victoria Louise of Prussia
 Princess Victoria Margaret of Prussia
 Princess Victoria Melita of Saxe-Coburg and Gotha
 Victoria, Princess Royal
 Queen Victoria
 Princess Viktoria of Prussia
 Princess Antonia, Duchess of Wellington
 Wilhelmina of the Netherlands
 Princess Wilhelmine, Duchess of Sagan

References

Sources
 Gottschalck, Friedrich. Almanach der Ritter-Orden. Leipzig, (Kingdom of) Saxony: Georg Joachim Goeschen, 1819.
 Handbuch über den Königlich Preußischen Hof und Staat für das Jahr 1874. Berlin: Kingdom of Prussia, 1873.
 Handbuch über den Königlich Preußischen Hof und Staat für das Jahr 1883. Berlin: Kingdom of Prussia, 1882.
 Handbuch über den Königlich Preußischen Hof und Staat für das Jahr 1907. Berlin: Kingdom of Prussia, 1906.

Awards established in 1814
Louise, Order of
Louise, Order of
Louise, Order of
Luisen-Orden
Louise of Mecklenburg-Strelitz
1814 establishments in Prussia
Orders of chivalry awarded to heads of state, consorts and sovereign family members